Dirk Daniël Hammann, known as Niel Hammann (born September 6, 1937), is a retired South African senior journalist. He was Editor-in-Chief of the Afrikaans weekly family magazine Huisgenoot, as well as its sister publication You (English).

Career 
Hammann was appointed assistant director of Huisgenoot in September 1977. He became editor of the magazine in 1978. Huisgenoot and You are published in Cape Town by Media24,an affiliate of the South African media giant Naspers. In the late seventies, Huisgenoot's weekly sales dropped to 129,000, causing the publishers to consider closing the publication. Hammann prevented Huisgenoot from closing and systematically revived the magazine. This was done in part by focusing on sesantional stories, celebrities, and crime. He also opened syndication offices in London.

The magazine's circulation grew to more than 500,000 in 1984, and a record high of 540,000 sales in one week in the 1990s. Huisgenoot had become the leading South African weekly. It was read by considerably more than two million people every week based on Average Issue Readership of more than 4 per copy sold.

The magazine You, which Hammann launched in 1987 as a kind of English "clone" of Huisgenoot, followed the same spiral upwards from the start, soon achieving second place on the popularity list for South African magazines. Hammann changed the magazine's content to meet international standards which he had previously studied as London editor for Naspers's magazines.

Hammann retired in the late nineties.

Personal life 
Hammann has a wife, Marlene.

Awards 
Naspers awarded him their highest accolade, while The South African Academy for Science and Arts (Afrikaans: Die Suid-Afrikaanse Akademie vir Wetenskap en Kuns) awarded him with their medal for excellence in journalism.

References 

1937 births
Living people
South African journalists
Stellenbosch University alumni
South African newspaper editors
South African magazine editors
People from Cape Town